Xavier Florencio Cabré (born December 26, 1979 in Tarragona, Catalonia) is a Spanish former professional road bicycle racer, who competed as a professional between 2001 and 2013.

Career
Xavier Florencio Cabré is an ex Catalan cyclist, born in Mont-roig del Camp (Tarragona) on the 26th of December 1979.
From a family of cyclists, his father José and his sister Núria were also professional cyclists.

At present he lives in Andorra with his wife Xary, who also rode professionally, and with whom he shares his interest in cycling and sport. His two daughters, Lola and Vera, are his biggest fans.

Xavier started as a professional as part of the ONCE-Eroski team in August of the year 2000 in the Vuelta a Galicia, he remained with this team until the end of 2003. He spent the following two years 2004–2005 with Relax-Bodysol and the next with Relax-Fuenlabrada. After his two years with the Relax Team he was three years with the French team Bouygues Telecom and it was there that he triumphed winning the San Sebastian Classic in 2006, beating a group of illustrious cyclists in the sprint, such as Stefano Garzelli, Andrey Kasheckin and Alejandro Valverde.

After two years with the French team he signed for two seasons with the Cervelo-Test Team after their lead cyclist Carlos Sastre requested that Xavier join the team. Finishing with the Swiss team he signed with Geox for a year following that he signed with Katusha until 25 October 2013 when he announced his retirement from cycling due to a health problem at 33 years old and after 13 seasons as a professional. Nonetheless he has remained linked with Katusha as an assistant in 2014 then in 2015 he became their Sports Director.

At present he is still a sports director in the cycling world as well as an entrepreneur in the hotel and services sector.

Career achievements

Major results

1996
 1st National Junior Road Race Championships
2002
 1st, 8th Stage, Tour de l'Avenir
 3rd, Vuelta a La Rioja
 5th, GP CTT Correios de Portugal
2003
5th, Ronde van Nederland
5th, Vuelta Valenciana
6th Tour Down Under
2006
 1st, Clásica de San Sebastián
 3rd, Overall, Tour de l'Ain
2007
4th, National Road Race Championships
9th, Clásica de San Sebastián
2008
 3rd Overall Volta a la Comunitat Valenciana
1st, Points classification
 3rd Overall Tour du Limousin
2012
 9th Clásica de San Sebastián

Grand Tour general classification results timeline

References

External links
Profile on Team Katusha official website

1979 births
Living people
Cyclists from Catalonia
Spanish male cyclists
Sportspeople from Tarragona